The following lists events that happened during 1920 in Afghanistan.

Incumbents
 Monarch – Amanullah Khan

Spring 1920
As relations with Britain have remained strained, a conference between British and Afghan representatives takes place at Mussoorie, which results in steps being taken to reestablish more normal relations and to settle outstanding questions. No further hostilities occur, though there is some fear on the British side that Russian influence is penetrating the country to some extent.

 
Afghanistan
Years of the 20th century in Afghanistan
Afghanistan
1920s in Afghanistan